The 2005 Sharpie 500 was the 24th stock car race of the 2005 NASCAR Nextel Cup Series season and the 45th iteration of the event. The race was held on Saturday, August 27, 2005, before a crowd of 160,000 in Bristol, Tennessee at Bristol Motor Speedway, a 0.533 miles (0.858 km) permanent oval-shaped racetrack. The race took the scheduled 500 laps to complete. At race's end, Matt Kenseth of Roush Racing would dominate the race to win his 10th career NASCAR Nextel Cup Series win and his first and only win of the season. To fill out the podium, Jeff Burton of Richard Childress Racing and Greg Biffle of Roush Racing would finish second and third, respectively.

Background 

The Bristol Motor Speedway, formerly known as Bristol International Raceway and Bristol Raceway, is a NASCAR short track venue located in Bristol, Tennessee. Constructed in 1960, it held its first NASCAR race on July 30, 1961. Despite its short length, Bristol is among the most popular tracks on the NASCAR schedule because of its distinct features, which include extraordinarily steep banking, an all concrete surface, two pit roads, and stadium-like seating. It has also been named one of the loudest NASCAR tracks.

Entry list

Practice 
The first and only two-hour practice session would occur on Friday, August 26, at 12:00 PM EST.

Qualifying 
Qualifying was held on Friday, August 26, at 6:10 PM EST. Each driver would have two laps to set a fastest time; the fastest of the two would count as their official qualifying lap.

6 drivers would fail to qualify: Wayne Anderson, Mike Garvey, Johnny Sauter, Morgan Shepherd, P. J. Jones, and Tony Raines.

Full qualifying results

Race results

References 

2005 NASCAR Nextel Cup Series
NASCAR races at Bristol Motor Speedway
August 2005 sports events in the United States
2005 in sports in Tennessee